Mimopacha gerstaeckerii is a species of Lasiocampidae moth.

Distribution
It is known from East, Central and West Africa.

References

Dewitz, 1881. Afrikanische Nachtschmetterlinge. Nova acta Leopoldina Bd. 42, no. 2

External links

Lasiocampidae
Moths of Africa
Moths described in 1881